The 1984–85 FA Trophy was the sixteenth season of the FA Trophy.

Preliminary round

Ties

Replays

First qualifying round

Ties

Replays

2nd replays

Second qualifying round

Ties

Replays

Third qualifying round

Ties

Replays

2nd replay

3rd replay

1st round
The teams that given byes to this round are Northwich Victoria, Maidstone United, Nuneaton Borough, Altrincham, Wealdstone, Runcorn, Bath City, Worcester City, Barnet, Kidderminster Harriers, Telford United, Frickley Athletic, Scarborough, Enfield, Gateshead, Dagenham, Dartford, Barrow, Bangor City, Wycombe Wanderers, Blyth Spartans, Leytonstone Ilford, A P Leamington, Chorley, Harrow Borough, Whitby Town, Fisher Athletic, Matlock Town, Marine, Worthing, Dulwich Hamlet and North Shields.

Ties

Replays

2nd replays

2nd round

Ties

Replays

3rd round

Ties

Replays

2nd replay

3rd replay

4th round

Ties

Semi finals

First leg

Second leg

Final

Tie

References

General
 Football Club History Database: FA Trophy 1984-85

Specific

1984–85 domestic association football cups
League
1984-85